Aegopinella nitens is a species of small land snail, a terrestrial pulmonate gastropod mollusk in the family Gastrodontidae, the glass snails.

Distribution 
This species occurs in the Czech Republic, Ukraine and other countries.

References

Gastrodontidae
Gastropods described in 1831